Hans-Jörg Leitzke (born 27 December 1960) is a German former footballer who is now a coach.

External links
Career stats

1960 births
Living people
German footballers
East German footballers
Association football forwards
FC Sachsen Leipzig players
1. FC Lokomotive Leipzig players
German football managers
DDR-Oberliga players
Footballers from Leipzig
People from Bezirk Leipzig